Womel Brandy Mento (born 17 July 1997) is a male Vanuatuan sprinter. He competed in the 100 metres event at the 2015 World Championships in Athletics in Beijing, China.

See also
 Vanuatu at the 2015 World Championships in Athletics

References

Vanuatuan male sprinters
Living people
Place of birth missing (living people)
1997 births
World Athletics Championships athletes for Vanuatu